Shahabuddin Yaqoob Quraishi (born 11 June 1947) is an Indian civil servant who served as 17th Chief Election Commissioner (CEC) of India. He was appointed as the CEC as the successor to Navin Chawla on 30 July 2010. He has also served as a Secretary in the Ministry of Youth Affairs and Sports.

Career 

He is an IAS officer of the 1971 batch from Haryana cadre. He has a PhD in communications and social marketing.

Quraishi became the first Muslim to be the CEC of India. He demitted office on 10 June 2012.

He has authored a book titled 'An Undocumented Wonder – the Making of the Great Indian Election', a book that describes the enormity and complexity of the Indian election and a book titled Old Delhi- Living Traditions a coffee table book on the heritage city and its social and cultural life. His latest book The Population Myth reveals how the right-wing spin to population data has given rise to myths about the 'Muslim rate of growth', often used to stoke majoritarian fears of a demographic skew. The book busts myths about Islam and family planning.

He figured in The Indian Express list of 100 Most Powerful Indians of 2011 and again in 2012

He now pursues his interests in academics by teaching & mentoring at Cluster Innovation Centre, University of Delhi in the capacity of Honorary Professor at the centre. He is also a current member of the International Elections Advisory Council.

While responding to Karan Thapar on the Devil's Advocate programme on the television channel CNN-IBN, he opposed the ideas of Right to Recall and Right to Reject advocated by Anna Hazare as not possible in India. However, after some time in a TV interview he said that the Right to Reject can be considered.

Dr. S Y Quraishi was awarded the Honorary Fellowship of the National Indian Students Union UK in May 2016. He joined Shabana Azmi and Javed Akhtar who were the first recipients of the Fellowship.

References

External links

 
 LegalEra Interview

1947 births
Living people
Indian Muslims
Place of birth missing (living people)
Chief Election Commissioners of India
St. Stephen's College, Delhi alumni
Indian Administrative Service officers
People of the Sri Lankan Civil War
Indian Peace Keeping Force